Clarksfield Township is one of the nineteen townships of Huron County, Ohio, United States. As of the 2010 census the population of the township was 1,625.

Geography
Located on the eastern edge of the county, it borders the following townships:
Wakeman Township - north
Camden Township, Lorain County - northeast
Brighton Township, Lorain County - east
Rochester Township, Lorain County - southeast corner
New London Township - south
Fitchville Township - southwest corner
Hartland Township - west
Townsend Township - northwest corner

No municipalities are located in Clarksfield Township, although the unincorporated community of Clarksfield lies in the township's northwest.

Name and history
Clarksfield Township was named for James Clark, a hero of the Revolutionary War.

It is the only Clarksfield Township statewide.

Government
The township is governed by a three-member board of trustees, who are elected in November of odd-numbered years to a four-year term beginning on the following January 1. Two are elected in the year after the presidential election and one is elected in the year before it. There is also an elected township fiscal officer, who serves a four-year term beginning on April 1 of the year after the election, which is held in November of the year before the presidential election. Vacancies in the fiscal officership or on the board of trustees are filled by the remaining trustees.

References

External links
County website

Townships in Huron County, Ohio
Townships in Ohio